Trisha Kanyamarala is an Irish chess player of Indian origin. In January 2020, aged 14, she became Ireland's first Woman International Master.

Originally from Hyderabad, Kanyamarala took up chess in 2014. She is an Irish citizen and has received letter of appreciation from the President of Ireland for her achievement of becoming Ireland's first Woman International Master. She was a guest of the President of Ireland Michael D. Higgins at a garden party in 2022 in Áras an Uachtaráin.

References

Chess Woman International Masters
Irish female chess players
Irish people of Indian descent
2000s births
Living people
People from Hyderabad, India
Indian emigrants to Ireland